Bulgarian dialects are the regional varieties of the Bulgarian language, a South Slavic language. Bulgarian dialectology dates to the 1830s and the pioneering work of Neofit Rilski, Bolgarska gramatika (published 1835 in Kragujevac, Serbia, then Ottoman Empire). Other notable researchers in this field include Marin Drinov, Konstantin Josef Jireček, Lyubomir Miletich, Aleksandar Teodorov-Balan, Stoyko Stoykov.

The dialects of Macedonian are classified as part of Bulgarian in the older literature. The Bulgarian linguistics continue to treat it as such in.
Since the second half of the 20th century, foreign authors have mostly adopted the convention of treating these in terms of a separate Macedonian language, following the codification of Macedonian as the literary standard language of Yugoslav Macedonia. However, some contemporary linguists still consider Macedonian as a dialect of Bulgarian. Macedonian authors in turn tend to treat all dialects spoken in the geographical region of Macedonia as Macedonian, including those spoken in Bulgarian Macedonia. Together with their closest lexical and grammatical relative they comprise the Eastern South Slavic branch. The present article treats all these dialects together, because of their close structural similarity and the fact that many important dialect boundaries intersect both territories.

The Bulgarian ethnos absorbed diverse Slavic tribes and not a particular language. The main isogloss separating the Bulgarian dialects into Eastern and Western is the yat border, marking the different mutations of the Old Bulgarian yat form (ѣ, *ě), pronounced as either /ʲa/ or /ɛ/ to the east (byal, but plural beli in Balkan dialects, "white") and strictly as /ɛ/ to the west of it (bel, plural beli) throughout former Yugoslavia. Isoglosses shape three groups. Besides the Eastern and Western dialects, the Rup group of dialects is distinct, which comprises the Rhodopes and everything southwards from Thessaloniki to Istanbul, although it is an Eastern dialect. The official language derives most often from the northeastern group of dialects nominally based on Veliko Tarnovo dialect. Many Western South Slavic lexical, morphological and phonological isoglosses are present in all Western Bulgarian dialects and rarer in Rup dialects, which peak in Torlakian. Bulgarian, Macedonian and Serbian dialects share characteristics far beyond the Torlakian area and beyond the contested territories of the medieval Bulgarian and Serbian states, which are west of Sofia. So, these political entities are not responsible for the transitional features, but they are basically rooted in other type of evolution, likely in a makeup in the contact area of the two sources of Eastern and Western South Slavic tribes. The makeup of the transitional area shows a mix of Eastern and Western South Slavic characteristics found in western Bulgaria, which contact happened in the Balkans assuming the exact location of this area. All isoglosses commonly share gradual borders deep inside the country, but the northeast always don't, which likely means that the contact zone mixed after the settling of the Slavs in the Balkans. In one instance both a and ъ for nasal yus are part of Elin Pelin dialect. Probably one of the words that remain the same on one of the largest areas in Bulgaria is that for night nosht, which is at best rare in other Slavic languages, in which along with the Torlaks in Bulgaria noch means night.

In eastern Bulgarian dialects in contrast with the other South Slavic languages, standard Ukrainian and Czech, the unstressed vowel e by palatalization turns into i or ie.  The Bulgarian pronouns in third person toy, te are documented in some Ukrainian dialects.

Bulgarian dialects can be divided into the following dialectal groups and individual dialects:

See also

 History of the Bulgarian language
 Bulgarian lexis
 Bulgarian grammar
 Torlakian dialect
 Macedonian language
 Slavic dialects of Greece

Notes

References

Bulgarian language
 
Dialects by language